The U Sports East–West Bowl is an annual preseason Canadian university football all-star game which showcases the top U Sports football prospects in the country who will be eligible for the following year's CFL Draft. The East–West Bowl is organized by the Canadian University Football Coaches Association (CUFCA) with the support of the Canadian Football League (CFL). It brings together over 90 of the top U Sports football players for a week of practices and evaluation, culminating with the annual all-star game. A national committee of U Sports head coaches selects the participants from a pool of players nominated by their respective universities. Players who are generally in their third year of eligibility are the prime candidates for nomination. Every U Sports football program is represented by a minimum of three and a maximum of four players who will be eligible for the CFL draft the following year. Each school submits a list of six players they nominate. A committee of U Sports coaches and CFL representatives review the nominations and determine who gets invited.

History 
The East–West Bowl began in 2003, when U Sports was known as Canadian Interuniversity Sport (CIS). The first edition was held in Waterloo, Ontario at Wilfrid Laurier University. Wilfrid Laurier hosted the first three years of the event in Waterloo from 2003 to 2005. The next two years of the East–West Bowl, 2006 and 2007, took place in Quebec City at Laval University, followed by McMaster University hosting the 2008 game in Hamilton, Ontario. Western University then hosted the event for six consecutive years from 2009 to 2014 in London, Ontario. In 2015 and 2016, the event was hosted for the first time by McGill University in Montreal, Quebec. The game was awarded to Laval again for 2017 and 2018. The game was hosted by Carleton in 2019 and was scheduled to be hosted by Carleton in 2020, but was cancelled due to the COVID-19 pandemic. With the game also cancelled in 2021 due to the ongoing pandemic, McMaster was named as the host for the 2022 game.

CIS changed its name to U Sports in October 2016.

Notable past participants 
Notable past participants of the East–West Bowl who have moved on to have careers in the CFL (Canadian Football League) and/or NFL (National Football League) include: Hec Crighton trophy winners Benoit Groulx of Laval, Daryl Stephenson of Windsor, Andy Fantuz of Western, Jesse Lumsden of McMaster and Tommy Denison of Queen's. Former Sherbrooke University player Samuel Giguère and Calgary University graduate Dan Federkeil, were both former members of the 2010 Super Bowl finalist Indianapolis Colts. Former Western University Mustang, Vaughn Martin, was drafted in the fourth round of the 2009 NFL Collegiate Draft by the San Diego Chargers.

East–West Bowl results

East–West Week 
Players participate in week long activities, drills and evaluations which are much more important than the actual all-star game. The game itself is the final event of what is a busy schedule for CFL prospects and U Sports players over the last seven days.

Players are housed by the hosting university for the week and attend daily practices and meetings in which they are constantly evaluated on both their physical football capabilities as well as their mental knowledge and understanding of the game. Players that comprise the East team practice with each other for most of the week, while players on the West team do the same; however, there are certain practices where East players will match up against players from the West team in a variety of team and one-on-one competitions. Players are coached by a variety of different coaches from different U Sports members throughout the week. Additionally, some of the coaching also comes directly from CFL coaches and all of it comes under the watchful eyes of CFL player personnel people, coaches and executives.

During the week of practices and evaluations players also compete in a combine which puts the players through a variety of drills designed to evaluate and assess the athletes agility, speed and strength. The East–West combine is a dry run for players who hope to receive invites to CFL combine the following spring.

Combine Test and Evaluation 
The combine includes the following drills which athletes will be tested and evaluated on:
 40 yard dash
 Bench press (225 lb repetitions)
 Vertical jump
 Broad jump
 20 yard shuttle run
 3 cone drill
 Position-specific drills
 Physical measurements

Teams 

As of 2017, the East Team contains players from the AUS and RSEQ conferences as well as players from Carleton, Ottawa, and Queen's. The West Team is made up of players from Canada West and the remaining Ontario University Association (OUA) universities.

 East Team 
 Concordia University
 Université de Montreal
 McGill University
 Université Laval
 Université de Sherbrooke
 Bishop's University
 Acadia University
 Mount Allison University
 Saint Francis Xavier University
 Saint Mary's University
 Queen's University
 Carleton University
 University of Ottawa
 West Team 
 University of British Columbia
 University of Calgary
 University of Alberta
 University of Saskatchewan
 University of Regina
 University of Manitoba
 University of Windsor
 University of Western Ontario
 University of Waterloo
 Wilfrid Laurier University
 University of Guelph
 McMaster University
 University of Toronto
 York University

References 

U Sports football